Yuliya Bichyk (Yuliya Bichik; born 1 April 1983) is a Belarusian rower. Partnering with Natallia Helakh, she won a bronze medal in the coxless pairs in 2004 and 2008, and finished in fourth place in the eights in 2000.

References

External links
 

Living people
Belarusian female rowers
Olympic bronze medalists for Belarus
Olympic rowers of Belarus
Rowers at the 2000 Summer Olympics
Rowers at the 2004 Summer Olympics
Rowers at the 2008 Summer Olympics
Rowers at the 2016 Summer Olympics
1983 births
Olympic medalists in rowing
Medalists at the 2008 Summer Olympics
Medalists at the 2004 Summer Olympics
World Rowing Championships medalists for Belarus
Sportspeople from Minsk
European Rowing Championships medalists